Worsley railway station was opened in 1864 to serve the town of Worsley in Greater Manchester. The Tyldesley Loopline  closed in 1969 as a result of the Beeching Axe.

History

Worsley Station opened on 1 September 1864 at the same time as other stations on the Manchester and Wigan Railway line. Local colliery owners including the Earl of Ellesmere were among its supporters. The station was built of white brick with details in red and black brick. The station had two first class and two second class waiting rooms and a booking office. It had a glass canopy and the platforms were 100 yards in length.

The former track bed is now part of a footpath and the station platforms still survive.

References
Notes

Bibliography

Disused railway stations in Salford
Former London and North Western Railway stations
Beeching closures in England
Railway stations in Great Britain opened in 1864
Railway stations in Great Britain closed in 1969